The Sisters is an c. 1860 oil painting illustrated by Victorian painter James Collinson, who was a Pre-Raphaelite Brotherhood member (1848 to 1850) from the mid-19th century.

References 

Portraits of women
19th-century paintings
Pre-Raphaelite paintings